DyP may refer to:

 Dynamic programming
 Dye decolorizing peroxidase, an enzyme